"Maniac" is a song recorded by South Korean boy band Stray Kids. It was released as the second track of their sixth Korean extended play (EP), Oddinary, and serves as its lead single on March 18, 2022, through JYP Entertainment and Republic Records. 
Written by Stray Kids in-house production team 3Racha, and Versachoi, "Maniac" is a trap, electropop song about "odd" people who break the "ordinary" social norms set by the world, referred to Frankenstein's monster.

Commercially, "Maniac" peaked at number 29 on the South Korea's Gaon Digital Chart, and made its first appearance on the US Billboard Bubbling Under Hot 100 at number 19, as well as in Australia, Canada, Portugal, and the United Kingdom. The song also debuted atop World Digital Song Sales, which is the second song after "Mixtape: Oh".  It took two wins from the music programs: Show Champion, and Music Bank, and was nominated for Best K-Pop Video at 2022 MTV Video Music Awards.

Background and release

On February 13, 2022, after the fan meeting 2nd #LoveStay 'SKZ's Chocolate Factory', Stray Kids surprisingly premiered the trailer video for the upcoming EP Oddinary, scheduled for release on March 18. The completed track listing of the EP was posted on March 3, confirming "Maniac" as the lead single. Three music video teasers were uploaded from March 15 to 17. "Maniac" was released alongside the EP, in conjunction with its accompanying music video, According to a Nylon interview, the member Han said that the song was written during fall and winter, and 3Racha want to give off a different vibe from the previous single, "Thunderous". The Japanese version of "Maniac" was pre-released on May 18, through Epic Records Japan and included on the group's Japanese-language second EP Circus, scheduled for release on June 22.

Lyrics and composition

"Maniac" is described as a Middle Eastern-influenced "powerful" trap, electropop song, with bass-synth drop, bird-chirping, and drill sounds. It was composed in the key of C♯ major, 120 beats per minute with a running time of three minutes and two seconds. The song was written by Stray Kids' in-house production team 3Racha, consisting of Bang Chan, Changbin, and Han, and co-composed with Versachoi, who also handle in arrangement with Bang Chan. It is 3Racha and Versachoi's second collaboration on the Stray Kids' lead single after "God's Menu" from Go Live (2020). Lyrically, "Maniac" supports the thematic of Oddinary, expressing the story of "odd" people who break the "ordinary" social norms and expectations set by society, comparing them with Frankenstein's monster having a few screws loose.

Critical reception

Teen Vogue Crystal Bell compared "Maniac" as "proof enough that it doesn't matter which way Stray Kids decide to turn" if Oddinary exists at the crossroads. She praised the group "can continue to evolve their sound while also staying true to themselves as artists." NME critic, Tássia Assis, admired that "how much Stray Kids refined their talents for this comeback, successfully combining their abrasive energy with more tempered tones." Yemi from Idology said that the song "shows a relatively flexible mood compared to previous works that were consistent with divergence, and it was impressive that the group's unique strong energy was still there, but that they had enough room to try to make rapid adjustments." Time and NME listed "Maniac" as one of the best K-pop song in the first half of 2022. Rolling Stone ranked "Maniac" number 56 on its list of the Best Songs of 2022.

Commercial performance

In South Korea, "Maniac" debuted at number 105 on the Gaon Digital Chart in the chart issue dated March 13–19, 2022. The song also debuted at number six on the component Download Chart, and number two on the BGM Chart. After that, the song ascended to number 29 on the main chart in the next week, becoming the group's highest peak on the chart, including number two on the Download Chart. In Japan, "Maniac" entered Billboard Japan Hot 100 at number 89 and jumped to number 43 in its next week. 
After the Japanese version release, the song re-entered and peaked at number 21. The song also peaked at number 33 on the Oricon Combined Singles Chart, while the Japanese version at number 28. In other Asia-Pacific countries, "Maniac" entered Malaysia's RIM International Singles at number four, Singapore's RIAS Top Streaming Chart at number nine, Billboard Vietnam Hot 100 at number 82, Australia's ARIA Singles Chart at number 79, and New Zealand RMNZ Hot Singles at number four.

In North America, "Maniac" debuted at number 19 on the Billboard Bubbling Under Hot 100, becoming their first appearance on the chart, as well as number one on the World Digital Song Sales, making it the second song to top the chart after "Mixtape: Oh". The song also entered Canadian Hot 100 at number 79. In Europe, "Maniac" appeared for the first time on the main UK Singles Chart at number 98, and AFP Top 200 Single at number 149. Furthermore, the song charted in Hungary (14), and Lithuania (48). Globally, the song debuted at number 21 on the Billboard Global 200, as well as number 12 on the Global Excl. U.S., becoming the group's highest charted song. For Billboard Hits of the World, the song appeared on the Indonesia (14), Malaysia (2), Philippines (22), Russia (4), and Singapore (10) Songs charts.

Music video

An accompanying music video for "Maniac was uploaded on March 18, in conjunction with the Oddinary release. Directed by Bang Jae-yeob, and choreographed by MOTF (Men of the Future), the music video oscillates between two worlds, depicting the members exploring various locations of a deserted town in an alternate dimension, and doing random things, such as playing on the subway or cleaning up the diner, and the upside-down version of the town. It also shows a giant, graffitied brain, before being transported back to the real world at the end, where the members hold part-time jobs and hang out. 

Rolling Stone India Divyansha Dongre compares the two worlds as "Marvel multiverse meets the Stranger Things upside-down". The music video reached 50 million views on March 30, and 100 million views on June 22, becoming the sixth music video to reach this milestone following "God's Menu", "Miroh", "Back Door", "My Pace", and "Thunderous".

Live performances

Stray Kids performed "Maniac" for the first time on March 18, the same date as the release, at Music Bank and The Late Show with Stephen Colbert. However, in that day, JYP Entertainment announced that the promotions had been postponed due to most members, except Felix and I.N, testing positive for COVID-19. On March 26, the label announced that Stray Kids would continue promoting at the music shows beginning at Show Champion on March 30, including M Countdown, Music Bank, Inkigayo, and Show! Music Core. The group also performed "Maniac" at Virtual Gayo Top 10 on March 25, and MTV Fresh Out Live on April 1. 

Stray Kids included "Maniac" on the set list of their Maniac World Tour (2022). The group performed the song at Seoul Festa's K-Pop Super Live concert at Seoul Olympic Stadium on August 10, alongside "God's Menu". Stray Kids performed "Maniac" and "Venom" with the theme "Do You Want to Be Oddinary" at 2022 MAMA Awards on November 29. The show depicted a concept of "bizarre laboratory creating eight maniacs" and featured giant spider AR wrapped around the stage. They also performed the song alongside "Case 143" at the 2022 KBS Song Festival on December 16. The group performed the Japanese version at NHK General TV's Venue101 on June 11, broadcast from World Memorial Hall, where the group held the Kobe show of their concert tour, as well as Best Artist 2022 on December 3, alongside "Circus.

Accolades

Credits and personnel

Credits adapted from Oddinary liner notes.

Locations
 JYP Publishing (KOMCA) – original publishing
 JYPE Studios – recording
 Channie's "Room" – recording
 Larrabee Studios – mixing
 The Mastering Palace – mastering

Personnel
 Stray Kids – vocals
 Bang Chan (3Racha) – lyrics, composition, arrangement, digital editing, recording
 Changbin (3Racha) – lyrics, composition
 Han (3Racha) – lyrics, composition
 Versachoi – composition, arrangement, all instruments, computer programming
 KayOne Lee – digital editing
 Goo Hye-jin – recording
 Manny Marroquin – mixing
 Chris Galland – mix engineering
 Ramiro Fernandez-Seoane – assistant
 Dave Kutch – mastering

Charts

Weekly charts

Monthly charts

Year-end charts

Release history

See also
 List of Music Bank Chart winners (2022)
 List of Show Champion Chart winners (2022)

References

2022 singles
2022 songs
JYP Entertainment singles
Korean-language songs
Republic Records singles
Songs about Frankenstein's monster
Stray Kids songs